The 2019–20 Appalachian State Mountaineers women's basketball team represented Appalachian State University in the 2019–20 NCAA Division I women's basketball season. The Mountaineers, led by sixth year head coach Angel Elderkin, played their home games at George M. Holmes Convocation Center and were members of the Sun Belt Conference. They finished the season 11–18, 8–10 in Sun Belt play to finish in eighth place. The Mountaineers were eliminated in the First Round of the Sun Belt tournament to Little Rock by the score of 47–48. Shortly after being eliminated, the Sun Belt canceled the tournament due to the COVID-19 pandemic, which was followed shortly by the NCAA cancelling all post-season play.

Preseason

Sun Belt coaches poll
On October 30, 2019, the Sun Belt released their preseason coaches poll with the Mountaineers predicted to finish in fifth place in the conference.

Sun Belt Preseason All-Conference team

2nd team

Bayley Plummer – SR, Center

3rd team

Pre Stanley – JR, Guard

Roster

Schedule

|-
!colspan=9 style=| Non-conference regular season

|-
!colspan=9 style=| Sun Belt regular season

|-
!colspan=9 style=| Sun Belt Women's Tournament

See also
2019–20 Appalachian State Mountaineers men's basketball team

References

Appalachian State
Appalachian State Mountaineers women's basketball seasons
Appalachian
Appalachian